Scrobipalpomima obsoleta is a moth in the family Gelechiidae. It was described by Povolný in 1985. It is found in Argentina.

See also 
 Scrobipalpomima
 Scrobipalpomima neuquenensis Povolný, 1985
 Scrobipalpomima improbabilis Povolný, 1989
 Scrobipalpomima karsholti Povolný, 1985
 Scrobipalpomima obscuroides Povolný, 1989
 Scrobipalpomima fugitiva Povolný, 1989
 Scrobipalpomima elongata Povolný, 1989
 Scrobipalpomima patagoniae Povolný, 1985
 Scrobipalpomima anonyma Povolný, 1985
 Scrobipalpomima schematica Povolný, 1985
 Scrobipalpomima excellens Povolný, 1985
 Scrobipalpomima grisescens Povolný, 1985
 Scrobipalpomima illustris Povolný, 1989
 Scrobipalpomima indifferens Povolný, 1985
 Scrobipalpomima obtusa Povolný, 1989
 Scrobipalpomima patens Povolný, 1985
 Scrobipalpomima pseudogrisescens Povolný, 1989
 Scrobipalpomima relicta Povolný, 1985
 Scrobipalpomima septemptrionalis Povolný, 1990
 Scrobipalpomima serena Povolný, 1989
 Scrobipalpomima symmetrischemoides Povolný, 1989
 Scrobipalpomima triangulignathos Povolný, 1985
 Scrobipalpomima questionaria Povolný, 1985
 Scrobipalpomima addenda Povolný, 1989
 Scrobipalpomima concurrens Povolný, 1989

References

Scrobipalpomima
Moths described in 1985
Moths of South America